The 2015 Southern Football League (SFL) premiership season was an Australian rules football competition staged across Southern Tasmania, Australia, over eighteen roster rounds and six finals series matches between 11 April and 26 September 2015.

The competition's major sponsor for the season was Worksafe Tasmania, Boag's Draught and Telstra.

This was the final season of participation for the East Coast Bombers, a team composed of a small number of players from the Triabunna Football Club (formed in 1900) and mostly reserve grade players from TSL club, Lauderdale, which had developed a partnership in order to put a competitive team on the ground each week and give Lauderdale's reserves players a competition to play in after the TSL axed the reserves competition after 2010.

The following season Triabunna decided to resume as a stand-alone club and joined the Oatlands District Football Association.

Participating Clubs
Brighton Football Club
Claremont Football Club
Cygnet Football Club
Dodges Ferry Football Club
East Coast Bombers Football Club
Hobart Football Club
Huonville Lions Football Club
Lindisfarne Football Club
New Norfolk District Football Club
Sorell Football Club

2015 SFL Club Coaches
 Jamie Ling (Brighton)
 Kim Excell (Claremont)
 Gavin Quirk (Cygnet)
 Rodney Dann (Dodges Ferry)
 Brett Copping (East Coast)
 Steve Woods (Hobart)
 Tim Lamprill (Huonville Lions)
 Adrian Goodwin (Lindisfarne)
 Caden Wilson (New Norfolk)
 David Lewis (Sorell)

2015 SFL Leading Goalkickers
 Sean Salter (Claremont) – 101
 Zeke Gardam (New Norfolk) – 67
 Tim Lamprill (Huonville Lions) – 61
 Sam Reeves (Hobart) – 61
 Nathan Brown (Claremont) – 57
 Caden Wilson (New Norfolk) – 55

SFL Reserves Leading Goalkicker
 David Cragg (Brighton) – 61

SFL Under-18s Leading Goalkicker
 Jacob Pate (Brighton) – 50

2015 Medal Winners
 Nathan Brown (Claremont) – William Leitch Medal (Seniors)
 Nathan Burdon (Claremont) – George Watt Medal (Reserves)
 Reegan Alforte (Claremont) – Lipscombe Medal (Under-18s)
 Nathan Matthews (Claremont) – Gorringe-Martyn Medal (Best Player in SFL Grand Final)

SFL Reserves Grand Final
Claremont 10.17 (77) d Brighton 4.1 (25) at KGV Football Park

SFL Under-18s Grand Final
Claremont 6.7 (43) d Huonville Lions 6.5 (41) at KGV Football Park

2015 SFL Ladder

Round 1
(Saturday, 11 April 2015) 
Claremont 16.11 (107) d New Norfolk 14.10 (94) at Boyer Oval. 
Dodges Ferry 21.19 (145) d Hobart 9.4 (58) at Shark Park 
Lindisfarne 13.12 (90) d Brighton 9.15 (69) at Pontville Oval. 
East Coast 28.21 (189) d Cygnet 8.5 (53) at Lauderdale Oval. 
Sorell 13.8 (86) d Huonville Lions 8.8 (56) at Huonville Recreation Ground.

Round 2
(Saturday, 18 April 2015) 
New Norfolk 11.20 (86) d Lindisfarne 6.8 (44) at Anzac Park. 
Brighton 22.15 (147) d Hobart 10.8 (68) at TCA Ground. 
Cygnet 9.12 (66) d Dodges Ferry 5.8 (38) at Cygnet Oval. 
East Coast 8.10 (58) d Sorell 4.6 (30) at Pembroke Park. 
Claremont 23.16 (154) d Huonville Lions 4.7 (31) at Abbotsfield Park.

Round 3
(Saturday, 25 April 2015) 
New Norfolk 32.17 (209) d Hobart 4.3 (27) at Boyer Oval. 
Brighton 19.19 (133) d Cygnet 5.4 (34) at Pontville Oval. 
East Coast 24.18 (162) d Dodges Ferry 14.7 (91) at Shark Park. 
Claremont 21.12 (138) d Sorell 3.6 (24) at Abbotsfield Park. 
Lindisfarne 17.12 (114) d Huonville Lions 12.16 (88) at Huonville Recreation Ground.

Round 4
(Saturday, 2 May 2015) 
New Norfolk 28.12 (180) d Cygnet 10.6 (66) at Cygnet Oval. 
Sorell 13.14 (92) d Dodges Ferry 8.13 (61) at Pembroke Park. 
Hobart 15.11 (101) d Huonville Lions 15.7 (97) at TCA Ground. 
Lindisfarne 13.16 (94) d Claremont 11.20 (86) at Anzac Park. 
East Coast 11.14 (80) d Brighton 10.15 (75) at Triabunna Recreation Ground.

Round 5
(Saturday, 16 May 2015) 
Brighton 12.12 (84) d Dodges Ferry 5.12 (42) at Pontville Oval. 
New Norfolk 21.24 (150) d East Coast 2.8 (20) at Boyer Oval. 
Lindisfarne 21.20 (146) d Sorell 7.9 (51) at Anzac Park. 
Claremont 27.13 (175) d Hobart 8.6 (54) at Abbotsfield Park. 
Huonville Lions 22.16 (148) d Cygnet 3.4 (22) at Huonville Recreation Ground.

Round 6
(Saturday, 23 May 2015) 
Claremont 33.21 (219) d Cygnet 5.8 (38) at Kermandie Oval.* 
Lindisfarne 17.16 (118) d Hobart 14.16 (100) at TCA Ground. 
Brighton 14.13 (97) d Sorell 9.8 (62) at Pontville Oval. 
New Norfolk 28.10 (178) d Dodges Ferry 8.5 (53) at Shark Park. 
Huonville Lions 12.13 (85) d East Coast 8.8 (56) at Lauderdale Oval 
Note: Cygnet played its home fixture at Kermandie Oval, former home of Kermandie Football Club.

Round 7
(Saturday, 30 May 2015) 
Claremont 10.15 (75) d East Coast 4.5 (29) at Abbotsfield Park. 
Lindisfarne 9.13 (67) d Cygnet 8.15 (63) at Anzac Park. 
Hobart 9.17 (71) d Sorell 8.10 (58) at Pembroke Park. 
New Norfolk 25.20 (170) d Brighton 8.4 (52) at Boyer Oval. 
Huonville Lions 12.14 (86) d Dodges Ferry 11.7 (73) at Huonville Recreation Ground.

Round 8
(Saturday, 13 June 2015) 
New Norfolk 20.15 (135) d Sorell 5.5 (35) at Boyer Oval. 
Cygnet 9.15 (69) d Hobart 8.9 (57) at Cygnet Oval. 
Huonville Lions 9.8 (62) d Brighton 6.11 (47) at Pontville Oval. 
Claremont 20.11 (131) d Dodges Ferry 13.10 (88) at Shark Park. 
East Coast 14.16 (100) d Lindisfarne 14.12 (96) at Triabunna Recreation Ground.

Round 9
(Saturday, 20 June 2015) 
Sorell 13.11 (89) d Cygnet 3.14 (32) at Pembroke Park. 
Hobart 17.16 (118) d East Coast 9.9 (63) at TCA Ground. 
Lindisfarne 10.16 (76) d Dodges Ferry 11.7 (73) at Anzac Park. 
Claremont 25.21 (171) d Brighton 6.7 (43) at Abbotsfield Park. 
New Norfolk 17.9 (111) d Huonville Lions 11.5 (71) at Huonville Recreation Ground.

Round 10
(Saturday, 27 June 2015) 
Dodges Ferry 18.12 (120) d Hobart 10.16 (76) at TCA Ground. 
Lindisfarne 17.7 (109) d Brighton 7.15 (57) at Anzac Park. 
Sorell 11.7 (73) d Huonville Lions 9.10 (64) at Pembroke Park. 
East Coast 15.13 (103) d Cygnet 8.5 (53) at Cygnet Oval. 
Claremont 8.14 (62) d New Norfolk 5.6 (36) at Abbotsfield Park.

Round 11
(Saturday, 11 July 2015) 
Brighton 21.16 (142) d Hobart 14.11 (95) at Pontville Oval. 
East Coast 8.21 (69) d Sorell 7.7 (49) at Lauderdale Oval. 
Dodges Ferry 16.12 (108) d Cygnet 11.8 (74) at Shark Park. 
New Norfolk 22.20 (152) d Lindisfarne 6.5 (41) at Boyer Oval. 
Claremont 20.18 (138) d Huonville Lions 4.13 (37) at Huonville Recreation Ground.

Round 12
(Saturday, 18 July 2015) 
New Norfolk 37.17 (239) d Hobart 6.5 (41) at TCA Ground. 
Claremont 14.28 (112) d Sorell 7.7 (49) at Pembroke Park. 
Cygnet 13.12 (90) d Brighton 9.16 (70) at Kermandie Oval.* 
Huonville Lions 12.12 (84) d Lindisfarne 11.14 (80) at Anzac Park. 
East Coast 10.16 (76) d Dodges Ferry 6.8 (44) at Triabunna Recreation Ground. 
Note: Cygnet played its home fixture at Kermandie Oval, former home of Kermandie Football Club.

Round 13
(Saturday, 25 July 2015) 
Dodges Ferry 13.12 (90) d Sorell 8.12 (60) at Shark Park.
New Norfolk 23.21 (159) d Cygnet 2.10 (22) at Boyer Oval. 
Brighton 13.14 (92) d East Coast 6.8 (44) at Pontville Oval. 
Claremont 24.17 (161) d Lindisfarne 11.6 (72) at Abbotsfield Park. 
Huonville Lions 20.22 (142) d Hobart 5.9 (39) at Huonville Recreation Ground.

Round 14
(Saturday, 1 August 2015) 
Lindisfarne 7.9 (51) d Sorell 7.2 (44) at Pembroke Park. 
Claremont 29.25 (199) d Hobart 3.4 (22) at TCA Ground. 
Brighton 15.14 (104) d Dodges Ferry 7.10 (52) at Shark Park. 
Huonville Lions 25.11 (161) d Cygnet 5.2 (32) at Cygnet Oval. 
New Norfolk 12.19 (91) d East Coast 5.10 (40) at Triabunna Recreation Ground.

Round 15
(Saturday, 8 August 2015) 
Lindisfarne 18.24 (132) d Hobart 11.7 (73) at Anzac Park. 
Brighton 15.9 (99) d Sorell 8.13 (61) at Pembroke Park. 
New Norfolk 21.20 (146) d Dodges Ferry 6.3 (39) at Boyer Oval. 
Claremont 40.25 (265) d Cygnet 3.2 (20) at Abbotsfield Park. 
Huonville Lions 17.4 (106) d East Coast 10.12 (72) at Huonville Recreation Ground.

Round 16
(Saturday, 15 August 2015) 
Lindisfarne 21.20 (146) d Cygnet 7.2 (44) at Cygnet Oval. 
Hobart 17.12 (114) d Sorell 14.19 (103) at TCA Ground. 
New Norfolk 20.16 (136) d Brighton 11.4 (70) at Pontville Oval. 
Huonville Lions 17.17 (119) d Dodges Ferry 7.8 (50) at Shark Park. 
Claremont 31.21 (207) d East Coast 8.7 (55) at Triabunna Recreation Ground.

Round 17
(Saturday, 22 August 2015) 
Hobart 22.20 (152) d Cygnet 15.14 (104) at TCA Ground. 
New Norfolk 16.15 (111) d Sorell 11.7 (73) at Pembroke Park. 
Lindisfarne 15.16 (106) d East Coast 7.9 (51) at Anzac Park. 
Claremont 22.22 (154) d Dodges Ferry 8.3 (51) at Abbotsfield Park. 
Huonville Lions 21.11 (137) d Brighton 7.6 (48) at Huonville Recreation Ground.

Round 18
(Saturday, 29 August 2015) 
Hobart 6.5 (41) d East Coast 4.14 (38) at Lauderdale Oval.* 
Cygnet 13.7 (85) d Sorell 6.7 (43) at Cygnet Oval. 
Claremont 22.19 (151) d Brighton 11.6 (72) at Pontville Oval. 
Lindisfarne 17.16 (118) d Dodges Ferry 7.13 (55) at Shark Park. 
New Norfolk 15.14 (104) d Huonville Lions 3.11 (29) at Boyer Oval. 
Note: This was the final match played by East Coast Bombers.

Elimination Final
(Saturday, 5 September 2015) 
Huonville Lions: 0.1 (1) | 5.4 (34) | 13.10 (88) | 14.12 (96) 
Brighton: 3.2 (20) | 7.3 (45) | 7.3 (45) | 10.8 (68) 
Attendance: N/A at Huonville Recreation Ground.

Qualifying Final
(Saturday, 5 September 2015) 
New Norfolk: 3.1 (19) | 5.5 (35) | 9.10 (64) | 14.10 (94) 
Lindisfarne: 4.4 (28) | 6.5 (41) | 8.9 (57) | 8.11 (59) 
Attendance: N/A at Boyer Oval.

First Semi Final
(Saturday 12 September 2015) 
Huonville Lions: 1.5 (11) | 5.11 (41) | 8.13 (61) | 18.18 (126) 
Lindisfarne: 5.8 (38) | 11.10 (76) | 15.15 (105) | 18.17 (125) 
Attendance: N/A at Anzac Park.* 
Note: Match went into overtime after scores were tied at the end of regular play.

Second Semi Final
(Saturday, 12 September 2015) 
Claremont: 3.4 (22) | 6.8 (44) | 12.12 (84) | 18.15 (123) 
New Norfolk: 1.0 (6) | 2.0 (12) | 6.5 (41) | 7.5 (47) 
Attendance: N/A at Abbotsfield Park.

Preliminary Final
(Sunday, 20 September 2015) 
New Norfolk: 3.6 (24) | 6.6 (42) | 9.10 (64) | 11.12 (78) 
Huonville Lions: 3.0 (18) | 5.4 (34) | 9.6 (60) | 11.9 (75) 
Attendance: N/A at KGV Football Park.

Grand Final
(Saturday, 26 September 2015) 
Claremont: 3.6 (24) | 13.8 (86) | 15.10 (100) | 16.15 (111) 
New Norfolk: 2.3 (15) | 3.3 (21) | 3.6 (24) | 6.11 (47) 
Attendance: 4,368 at KGV Football Park

External links 
 Official League Website (2015)

2014
2014 in Australian rules football